The 1987 Bologna Open was a men's tennis tournament played on outdoor clay courts in Bologna, Italy that was part of the 1987 Nabisco Grand Prix circuit. It was the third edition of the tournament and was played from 8 June until 14 June 1987. First-seeded Kent Carlsson won the singles title.

Finals

Singles
 Kent Carlsson defeated  Emilio Sánchez 6–2, 6–1
 It was Carlsson's 2nd singles title of the year and the 4th of his career.

Doubles
 Sergio Casal /  Emilio Sánchez defeated  Claudio Panatta /  Blaine Willenborg 6–3, 6–2

References

External links
 ITF tournament edition details

Bologna Outdoor
Bologna
1987 in Italian tennis